Ebrahim Peiravi (born 14 April 1933) is a retired Iranian middleweight weightlifter. He won silver medals at the 1958 Asian Games, He also participated at the 1956 Summer Olympics.

References

External links
 

1933 births
Living people
Iranian male weightlifters
Olympic weightlifters of Iran
Weightlifters at the 1956 Summer Olympics
Medalists at the 1958 Asian Games
Asian Games silver medalists for Iran
Weightlifters at the 1958 Asian Games
Asian Games medalists in weightlifting
20th-century Iranian people